Daniel McNicoll is an American independent film producer, screenwriter and director, most known for his film, Reclaiming the Blade. Reclaiming the Blade was a number one movie rental on iTunes and was distributed by Starz and Anchor Bay Entertainment. The soundtrack for the film which included major label artists, an orchestral score and some of McNicoll's own music was released on Lakeshore Records. McNicoll's next film, Glastonbury: Isle of Light, as reported by the BBC and other sources, has found funding and will begin pre-production in mid-2018.

Selected projects

References

External links
 
 

Year of birth missing (living people)
Living people
American film producers
American male screenwriters
American film directors
American male singers